Waqt Ka Badshah is a 1992 Indian Hindi-language film directed by Manmohan K. Sabir and produced by Suresh Chowdhary, starring Dharmendra, Vinod Khanna, Raj Babbar, Moon Moon Sen, Navin Nischol, Amjad Khan and Goga Kapoor.

Cast

Dharmendra
Vinod Khanna
Raj Babbar
Moon Moon Sen
Navin Nischol
Amjad Khan
Goga Kapoor

References

External links
 

1992 films
1990s Hindi-language films